Martine Duvivier (married name is Jacquemin; born 4 January 1953, at Curgies) is a former French athlete, who specialized in middle-distance running. She won two national titles in the 800 m in 1972 and 1973. Duvivier set a personal best of 2:02.2 minutes for the 800 m in 1972.

She participated in the 1972 Olympics in Munich. Eliminated in the first round of 800 m, she placed fourth in the final of 4 × 400 metres relay, alongside Colette Besson, Bernadette Martin and Nicole Duclos.  The France team improved twice on this occasion the French record of the 4 × 400 m relay.

National titles
 French Championships in Athletics
800 m: 1972, 1973

Personal bests

References

Living people
1953 births
Sportspeople from Valenciennes
French female middle-distance runners
Olympic athletes of France
Athletes (track and field) at the 1972 Summer Olympics
20th-century French women